The Cree Nation of Wemindji is a Cree First Nation of Northern Quebec, Canada. It is headquartered at the Cree village of Wemindji and also has the terre réservée crie of the same name, both located in the Eeyou Istchee territory. In 2016, it has a registered population of 1,589 members. It is in negotiation with the government of Canada to obtain its self-governance.

References

External links
 Official website
 First Nation Detail by Indigenous and Northern Affairs Canada

First Nations governments in Quebec
Cree governments